The Experiment was a documentary series broadcast on BBC television in 2002.

The Experiment may also refer to:

 Teen Big Brother: The Experiment, a UK spin off of the popular television program Big Brother
 The Experiment (Animorphs), the twenty-eighth book in the Animorphs series
 The Experiment (1922 film), a 1922 British silent film
 "The Experiment" (CBS Playhouse), broadcast as part of the CBS Playhouse series
 Das Experiment, a 2001 German film
 The Experiment (2010 film), a 2010 American film and remake of the 2001 German film
 The Experiment (video game), an adventure video game
 The Experiment (wrestler) (born 1967), Greco-Roman wrestler
 The Experiment (Dane Rumble album)
 The Experiment (Art vs. Science album)

See also
 Experiment (disambiguation)